Jonathan Herman (born 1973) is an American screenwriter, best known for his work in Straight Outta Compton for which he received numerous award nominations, including Best Original Screenplay at the 88th Academy Awards. Herman is Jewish.

Filmography 
 2015: Straight Outta Compton

Awards and nominations

References

External links 
 

1973 births
Living people
Screenwriters from Connecticut
American gay writers
Jewish American screenwriters
LGBT Jews
LGBT people from Connecticut
American LGBT screenwriters
21st-century American Jews